R Fornacis is a Mira variable and carbon star located in the constellation Fornax.

R Fornacis is a carbon star, a star on the asymptotic giant branch with an excess of carbon over oxygen in its atmosphere due to fusion products being dredged up to the surface from deep inside the star.  It is also a Mira variable, a type of pulsating giant star which varies by several apparent magnitudes with a period of a few hundred days.  R Fornacis has a period of 389 days and varies between extremes of magnitude 7.5 and 13.0, although average maximum and minimum magnitudes are 8.9 and 12.2 respectively..

R Fornacis was discovered to be variable in 1896 after it had been observed with a different brightness to that shown in the Cordoba Durchmusterung.  In 1983, an unusually deep minimum was observed, and later correlated with an asymmetric shell of material ejected from the surface of the star.  Unconfirmed visual estimates of the unusual minimum give a magnitude of 14.0, while infrared observations confirm the unusual variation.

References 

Mira variables
Carbon stars
Fornax (constellation)
Fornacis, R
IRAS catalogue objects
J02291531-2605559
Emission-line stars
Durchmusterung objects